Hemicircus is a genus of birds in the woodpecker family Picidae. Members of the genus are found in India and Southeast Asia.

These are small woodpeckers with short tails. The plumage is mainly black and white.

The genus was introduced in 1837 by the English naturalist William John Swainson with the grey-and-buff woodpecker (Hemicircus concretus) as the type species. The genus name combines the Ancient Greek 'hēmi meaning "half" or "small" and kerkos meaning "tail".

Species
The genus contains two species:

References

 
Bird genera
 
Taxonomy articles created by Polbot